East Cliff is a suburb and ward in Bournemouth, Dorset, England.

History 
In 2016, and again on 17 April 2021, a landslide occurred at the cliffside.

Buildings 
East Cliff is home to a number of expensive hotels, like Langtry Manor. Also in the area is the historic Russell-Cotes Art Gallery & Museum.

Politics 
East Cliff is part of the Bournemouth East constituency. East Cliff is also part of the East Cliff and Springbourne ward which elects three councillors to Bournemouth, Christchurch and Poole Council.

Transport 
Until 2019, the area was served by the East Cliff Railway.

References 

Areas of Bournemouth
Conservation areas in Dorset